Reggie Thornton (born September 26, 1967) is a former American football wide receiver. He played for the Indianapolis Colts in 1991 and for the Cincinnati Bengals in 1993.

References

1967 births
Living people
American football wide receivers
Bowling Green Falcons football players
Indianapolis Colts players
Cincinnati Bengals players